Charlie Kray (9 July 1927 – 4 April 2000) was an English amateur boxer and convicted criminal. He was the elder brother of Ronnie and Reggie Kray.

Early life 
Charles James Kray was born at 26 Gorsuch Street, Hoxton on 9 July 1927, to Charles David Kray (1907–1983), a wardrobe dealer, and Violet Annie Lee (1909–1982). His father was of Irish descent and his mother was Romani. When Kray was six-years-old, his mother had two identical twins, Ronnie and Reggie Kray, with Reggie born 10 minutes before Ronnie. His sister, Violet (1929) died in infancy.

In 1932, the family moved to Stene Street, near Kingsland Road, Hackney. The family later moved to 178 Vallance Road in Bethnal Green.

Kray attended Laburnum Street school, where he was selected for the football team.

Before the war, Kray worked for Lloyd's of London as a messenger boy in the city, earning around 18 shillings a week.

Boxing career 

Young Charlie was brought up on stories about fighting and boxing, and often dreamt of winning the Lonsdale Belt as Champion of the World.

In 1943, Kray represented the Royal Navy as a welterweight against the Army and the Air Force.

Kray soon took up boxing again and trained in the local gyms. His grandfather set up a punch bag in an upstairs room in Vallance Road.

After a spell of rheumatic fever, Kray joined the Naval Cadets, where he continued training seriously. He later joined the Navy where he boxed as a welterweight. However, he started to get terrible headaches and was soon discharged unfit from the Navy, on medical grounds, due to chronic migraines.

In his early twenties, Kray started to box professionally, winning a number of fights. He lost the last professional fight he fought.

Criminal history 
Although he did not have the violent reputation of his younger brothers, Kray was still an important component of the family's gangland history.

When the twins empire came crashing down in 1969, Charlie was inevitably dragged down with them. Kray was given a 10-year sentence for being an accessory to the murder of George Cornell. He was released from prison in 1975. After his release, he made money from promoting the family's legend.

In 1997, Kray was given a 12-year sentence for attempting to smuggle cocaine valued at £39m into Britain. Three years into his sentence, Kray's health started to deteriorate.

Personal life

Kray married Doris "Dolly" Moore on Christmas Day 1948. They had two children, Gary Kray (1951-1995) and Nancy. In an argument, Moore had said that Nancy was not Kray's daughter but then denied it. Gary died from lung cancer on 8 March 1995.

Kray later discovered Moore had been having an affair with George Ince, but stayed with her for the sake of his family. She continued to see Ince behind Kray's back. The couple separated in 1975.

During the 1950s, Kray had a six-month affair with Barbara Windsor, star of the Carry On films and EastEnders. The affair did not last long because his children and their happiness came first and staying with Moore provided them with a stable background.

Kray had been a confidant of Jackie Collins, Judy Garland, Sonny Liston and Christine Keeler.

Kray said he found life difficult and claimed he was "unemployable" because of his surname.

On the evening of 4 April 2000, Kray died from heart complications at St Mary's Hospital. He was 72. He had been suffering from a heart condition prior to his death. Kray died in the presence of his girlfriend, Diane Buffini, and two other friends. At the time of his death, Kray's only surviving brother Reggie was released from prison to attend his brothers funeral.

Kray's funeral was held at St Matthew's Church, Bethnal Green and he is buried at Chingford Mount Cemetery.

Published works 

 Me and My Brothers, with Robin McGibbon. Everest Books, 14 October 1976.
 Doing the Business, with Colin Fry. John Blake Publishing Ltd, April 1993.

References

1927 births
2000 deaths
English gangsters
English male boxers